Sušil may refer to:

 František Sušil (1804, Rousínov - 1868, Bystřice pod Hostýnem), a Moravian Roman Catholic priest
 21229 Sušil, a main belt asteroid

See also 
 Susil Moonesinghe, a Sri Lankan lawyer, politician and diplomat
 Susil Fernando
 Susil Premajayanth
 Sushil

Czech-language surnames